SNK 40th Anniversary Collection is a video game compilation developed by Digital Eclipse consisting of arcade and console games published by SNK between 1979 and 1990. The collection was released for the Nintendo Switch in 2018, later in 2019 for PlayStation 4 on 19 March, Xbox One on 3 May, and Steam on 7 July.

Games included
The collection includes 25 games (Xbox One version has an exclusive game that replaces another game from the other versions). Original arcade versions are included for every game except for Baseball Stars, Crystalis, and Iron Tank (never released in arcades), which run on Nintendo Entertainment System versions. NES ports of some other games are included.

† Not available in the Xbox One version (replaced by Baseball Stars).

†† Only available in the Xbox One version (content exclusive).

Any copyright information in the Console games' title screens regarding Nintendo are still present.

Reception

EGM said that it was "one of the most impressive retro compilations I’ve encountered in recent memory". Game Revolution were impressed with "how much care and thought went into every corner of it".

Jeux Video were not as impressed, saying "the good emulation, interface and fonctionnalities don't balance the cruel absence of many great SNK games".

Notes

References

External links
 

2018 video games
Nintendo Switch games
PlayStation 4 games
SNK game compilations
Video games developed in the United States
Windows games
Xbox One games
Digital Eclipse games
Multiplayer and single-player video games